Carry Me may refer to:
Carry Me (album), a 2013 album by Josh Wilson, or the title song
"Carry Me" (song), a 2016 song by Kygo
"Carry Me", song by Leæther Strip 2000
"Carry Me", a song by The Jealous Girlfriends from the album The Jealous Girlfriends
"Carry Me", a song by David Crosby and Graham Nash from the 1975 album Wind on the Water
 "Dead Man (Carry Me)", a 2006 song by Jars of Clay